Claude de Beauharnais may refer to:

Claude de Beauharnais (1680–1738)
Claude de Beauharnais (1717–1784), son of the above
Claude de Beauharnais (1756–1819), son of the above